Pulawski can refer to:

People
 Kazimierz Pulawski (1745–1779), Polish nobleman, soldier and military commander 
 Zygmunt Puławski (1901–1931), Polish aircraft designer, pilot

Places
 Pulawski Township, Michigan, United States
 Puławski or Puławy County, Poland

See also
 Pulaski (disambiguation)